"I Come from Another Planet, Baby" is a song by the English singer-songwriter Julian Cope. It is the first single released in support of his album Interpreter.

Chart positions

References

1996 singles
1996 songs
Julian Cope songs
Songs written by Julian Cope
The Echo Label singles